Newton Butte, in the Grand Canyon, Arizona, United States is a prominence below the South Rim, northwest of Grandview Point, and north on a ridgeline from  Shoshone Point which is one mile east of Yaki Point, East Rim Drive. Shoshone Point and Yaki are both on access roads from East Rim Drive, with Yaki being the more advantageous to different viewing directions.

The point location of Newton Butte extends due north from an intermediate point on the South Rim, Shoshone Point, which at the end of the Newton Butte point ridgeline, also forms the west perimeter of the Lonetree Canyon drainage, into Granite Gorge.

Just north of Newton Butte, 3/4 mi on the end of the point, is Pattie Butte, a lower elevation prominence, .

Two hiking trails are closest to Newton Butte. Across Granite Gorge, views south can be made from the Clear Creek Trail, at lower elevations or as it climbs past Zoroaster Canyon to ridgelines at the west of Clear Creek. The Tonto Trail on the Tonto Platform, south side of Granite Gorge, has the closest hiking points near the bottom elevations of Newton Butte.

Newton Butte is named for Sir Isaac Newton (1642–1727), and was officially adopted in 1906 by the U.S. Board on Geographic Names.

Access
Newton Butte can be viewed from the South Rim viewpoints from Yavapai Point, Yaki Point, Shoshone Point, or Grandview Point. Access to East Rim Drive. South Rim, is from the east, on Arizona State Route 64, from US 89. A west access to East Rim Drive is from Williams, Arizona, or Flagstaff, by way of U.S. Route 180 in Arizona.

Gallery

See also
 The Howlands Butte, across Granite Gorge, ~2 mi

References

External links 
  part of Newton Butte

Grand Canyon
Grand Canyon, South Rim
Landforms of Coconino County, Arizona
Mountains of Arizona
Mountains of Coconino County, Arizona